The Academy Award for Best Documentary Feature Film is an award for documentary films. In 1941, the first awards for feature-length documentaries were bestowed as Special Awards to Kukan and Target for Tonight. They have since been bestowed competitively each year, with the exception of 1946. Copies of every winning film (along with copies of most nominees) are held by the Academy Film Archive.

Winners and nominees 
Following the Academy's practice, films are listed below by the award year (that is, the year they were released under the Academy's rules for eligibility). In practice, due to the limited nature of documentary distribution, a film may be released in different years in different venues, sometimes years after production is complete.

1940s

1950s

1960s

1970s

1980s

1990s

2000s

2010s

2020s

Shortlisted finalists
Finalists for Best Documentary Feature are selected by the Documentary Branch based on a preliminary ballot. A second preferential ballot determines the five nominees. Prior to the 78th Academy Awards, there were twelve films shortlisted. These are the additional films that were shortlisted.

Superlatives 

For this Academy Award category, the following superlatives emerge:
 Most awards: 
Arthur Cohn  3 awards (resulting from 4 nominations);
Simon Chinn  2 awards;
Jacques-Yves Cousteau  2 awards;
Walt Disney  2 awards (resulting from 7 nominations; Disney has an additional 2 wins in the Documentary Short Subject category);
Rob Epstein  2 awards;
Marvin Hier  2 awards;
Barbara Kopple  2 awards

Process controversies 
Michael Moore's Fahrenheit 9/11, at the time the highest-grossing documentary film in movie history, was ruled ineligible because Moore had opted to have it played on television prior to the 2004 election. Previously, the 1982 winner Just Another Missing Kid had already been broadcast in Canada and won that country's ACTRA award for excellence in television at the time of its nomination.

In 1990, a group of 45 filmmakers filed a protest to the Academy of Motion Picture Arts and Sciences over a potential conflict of interest involving Mitchell Block.  They noted that Block was a member of the Documentary Steering Committee, which selects films as nominees, but he had a conflict of interest because his company Direct Cinema owned the distribution rights to three of the five films (including eventual winner Common Threads: Stories from the Quilt selected that year as nominees for an Academy Award for Best Documentary Feature. They noted that Michael Moore's Roger & Me (distributed by Warner Brothers) was omitted from the nominees, although it had been highly praised by numerous critics and was ranked by many critics as one of the top ten films of the year.

The controversy over Hoop Dreams exclusion was enough to have the Academy Awards begin the process to change its documentary voting system. Roger Ebert, who had declared it to be the best 1994 movie of any kind, looked into its failure to receive a nomination: "We learned, through very reliable sources, that the members of the committee had a system. They carried little flashlights. When one gave up on a film, he waved a light on the screen. When a majority of flashlights had voted, the film was switched off. Hoop Dreams was stopped after 15 minutes."

The Academy's executive director, Bruce Davis, took the unprecedented step of asking accounting firm Price Waterhouse to turn over the complete results of that year's voting, in which members of the committee had rated each of the 63 eligible documentaries on a scale of six to ten. "What I found," said Davis, "is that a small group of members gave zeros (actually low scores) to every single film except the five they wanted to see nominated. And they gave tens to those five, which completely skewed the voting. There was one film that received more scores of ten than any other, but it wasn't nominated. It also got zeros (low scores) from those few voters, and that was enough to push it to sixth place."

In 2000, Arthur Cohn, the producer of the winning One Day in September boasted "I won this without showing it in a single theater!" Cohn had hit upon the tactic of showing his Oscar entries at invitation-only screenings, and to as few other people as possible. Oscar bylaws at the time required voters to have seen all five nominated documentaries; by limiting his audience, Cohn shrank the voting pool and improved his odds. Following protests by many documentarians, the nominating system subsequently was changed.

Hoop Dreams director Steve James said "With so few people looking at any given film, it only takes one to dislike a film and its chances for making the short list are diminished greatly. So they've got to do something, I think, to make the process more sane for deciding the shortlist." Among other rule changes taking effect in 2013, the Academy began requiring a documentary to have been reviewed by either The New York Times or Los Angeles Times, and be commercially released for at least one week in both of those cities. Advocating the rule change, Michael Moore said "When people get the award for best documentary and they go on stage and thank the Academy, it's not really the Academy, is it? It's 5% of the Academy."

The awards process has also been criticized for emphasizing a documentary's subject matter over its style or quality. In 2009, Entertainment Weekly Owen Gleiberman wrote about the documentary branch members' penchant for choosing "movies that the selection committee deemed good because they're good for you... a kind of self-defeating aesthetic of granola documentary correctness."

In 2014, following the announcement of the shortlist of eligible feature documentary nominees, Sony Pictures Classics co-president Tom Bernard publicly criticized Academy documentary voters after they excluded SPC's Red Army from the shortlist. "It's a sign of some really old people in the documentary area of the Academy. There's a lot of people who are really up in their years. It's shocking to me that that film (Red Army) didn't get in," Bernard said. Additionally, in his reporting of the Oscar documentary shortlist exclusions that year, The Hollywood Reporter Scott Feinberg reacted to Red Army omission: "...no matter which 15 titles the doc branch selected, plenty of other great ones would be left on the outside. That is the case, most egregiously, with Gabe Polsky's Red Army (Sony Classics), a masterful look at the role of sports in society and Russian-American relations". (Icarus, another documentary related to sports and Russian-American relations, later won the Oscar.)

In 2017, following the win of the eight-hour O.J.: Made in America in this category, the Academy announced that multi-part and limited series would be ineligible for the award in the future, even if they are not broadcast after their Oscar-qualifying release (as was O.J.: Made in America).

Acclaimed documentaries not nominated for Best Documentary Feature
Dont Look Back (1967)
Salesman (1969)
Gimme Shelter (1970)
Grey Gardens (1975)
Gates of Heaven (1978)
Stop Making Sense (1984)
Shoah (1985)
The Thin Blue Line (1988) 
Roger & Me (1989) 
Paris Is Burning (1990)
Crumb (1994)
Hoop Dreams (1994)
The Celluloid Closet (1995)
American Movie (1999)
Fahrenheit 9/11 (2004)
Grizzly Man (2005)
The King of Kong (2007)
Dear Zachary: A Letter to a Son About His Father (2008)
Stories We Tell (2013)
Life Itself (2014)
Going Clear (2015)
Best of Enemies (2015)
Cameraperson (2016)
Jane (2017)
Dawson City: Frozen Time (2017)
Won't You Be My Neighbor? (2018)
Three Identical Strangers (2018)
They Shall Not Grow Old (2018)
Apollo 11 (2019)
One Child Nation (2019)
Boys State (2020)
Good Night Oppy (2022)

Documentaries with wins or nominations in other categories 
Though Academy rules do not expressly preclude documentaries from being nominated in other competitive categories, documentaries are typically considered ineligible for nominations in categories that presume the work is fictitious, including Best Production Design, Best Costume Design, and acting. To date, no documentaries have been nominated for Best Picture, or Best Director.  The Quiet One was nominated for Best Story and Screenplay.

No documentary feature has yet been nominated for Best Picture, although Chang was nominated in the "Unique and Artistic Production" category at the 1927/28 awards.

At the 3rd Academy Awards, prior to the introduction of a documentary category, With Byrd at the South Pole won the award for Best Cinematography, becoming the first documentary both to be nominated for and win an Oscar. 1952's Navajo would become the first film nominated for both Best Documentary and Best Cinematography. 

Woodstock was the first documentary to be nominated for Best Film Editing while Hoop Dreams was the second (although it was, controversially, not nominated for Best Documentary Feature). Woodstock is also the only documentary to receive a nomination for Best Sound. 

Honeyland became the first documentary to be nominated for both Best International Feature Film and Best Documentary Feature. The following year, Collective would accomplish the same double nomination. Prior to this, Waltz with Bashir became the first documentary and first animated film nominated for Best International Feature Film, although it was not nominated for Best Documentary Feature.  The Danish-language animated documentary Flee was later nominated for Best International Feature, Best Documentary Feature, and Best Animated Feature, the first film to accomplish this feat.

Eight documentaries have received nominations for Best Original Song: Mondo Cane (for Riz Ortolani and Nino Oliviero's "More"), An Inconvenient Truth (for Melissa Etheridge's "I Need to Wake Up", the only nominee from a documentary to win), Chasing Ice (for J. Ralph's "Before My Time"), Racing Extinction (for Ralph and Anhoni's "Manta Ray"), Jim: The James Foley Story (for Ralph and Sting's "The Empty Chair"), Glen Campbell: I'll Be Me (for Glen Campbell and Julian Raymond's "I'm Not Gonna Miss You"), The Hunting Ground (for Lady Gaga and Dianne Warren's "Til It Happens To You"), and RBG (for Warren's "I'll Fight").

Documentaries nominated for their scores include This is Cinerama, White Wilderness (which also won for Documentary Feature), Let It Be, and Birds Do It, Bees Do It.

Five documentary filmmakers have received honorary Oscars: Pete Smith, William L. Hendricks, D. A. Pennebaker, Frederick Wiseman, and Agnès Varda.

See also 
 BAFTA Award for Best Documentary
 Academy Award for Best Documentary (Short Subject)
 Independent Spirit Award for Best Documentary Feature
 Critics' Choice Movie Award for Best Documentary Feature
 Gotham Independent Film Award for Best Documentary
 Submissions for Best Documentary Feature
 Golden Globe Award for Best Documentary Film

Notes

References

External links 
 Academy of Motion Picture Arts and Sciences official site

Documentary Feature
American documentary film awards
Lists of documentary films
Awards established in 1942